Garrett Island is an island of the Arctic Archipelago, in the territory of Nunavut. It lies in the Barrow Strait, between Bathurst Island (to the north) and Lowther Island (to the southeast).

References

Uninhabited islands of Qikiqtaaluk Region
Islands of the Queen Elizabeth Islands